Nikolaos "Nikos" Lazaridis (born 12 July 1979) is a retired Greek football player. He is currently team manager for Atromitos.

Club career

Kozani
He made his professional debut in season 2000-2001. He stayed there for three seasons playing in Greece third division championship.

Kastoria
Lazaridis played for Kastoria for two seasons in the second division championship.  He was a member of the team that had stunned PAOK in Greek cup 2003-2004. In 2005, he moved to Panionios.

Panionios
For the first time he played to Greece's top level championship.

Asteras Tripolis
He moved to Asteras Tripolis in 2006 and was a basic member for the great success that Arcadia's team have made. The team within three years moved from Third division to Greece Superleague. He was capped plus 100 times before he moved to Aris in the summer of 2010.

Aris
Aris is the biggest step in his career.  For the first time he played to UEFA Europa League where Aris made a great impact in 2010-2011. He quickly established himself as a key member of his previous team's squad and managed to score the winning goal against Atlético Madrid, paving the path to next stage qualification for Aris.  The most memorable time of the season is his goal against Atletico Madrid.  Furthermore, he scored 4 goals in Superleague something that made him the second scorer for Aris 2010-2011 in domestic level. He named MVP of Aris 2010-2011 season. For his passion when playing for Aris, he named captain of the team in 2011-2012 season, giving fine appearances. As captain, he scored 4 crucial goals in his second season in Aris.

Atromitos
Lazaridis' contract with Aris is expiring on 30 June 2012,but it will not be extended. The player has come to an agreement with Greek Superleague club Atromitos for an unknown length of contract. Lazaridis will be announced soon and will join the team on July,1. On 20 May 2016, the Greek centre-back has renewed his contract with the club till the summer of 2017. On 14 April 2017 he solved his contract with the club. Lazaridis had 171 appearances (11 goals) in all competitions with the club.

Honours

Individual
Super League Greece Team of the Year: 2013–14

References

External links 
 Profile at Insports.gr
 Profile at Sport.gr
 Guardian Football

1979 births
Living people
Greek footballers
Kastoria F.C. players
Panionios F.C. players
Asteras Tripolis F.C. players
Aris Thessaloniki F.C. players
Atromitos F.C. players
Super League Greece players
Association football defenders
Footballers from Kozani